Ficus hispida also known as the opposite leaf Fig is a small but well distributed species of tropical fig tree. It is dioecious, with male and female flowers on separate individuals. It occurs in many parts of Asia and as far south east as Australia. There is a large variety of local common names. Like a number of ficus, the leaves are sandpapery to touch. An unusual feature is the figs which hang on long stems.

Species associated with Ficus hispida 
In Australia the fruit are eaten by cassowaries and double-eyed fig parrots. Phayre's leaf monkey feeds on the leaves as do the larvae of the moth Melanocercops ficuvorella. The fig wasp Apocrypta bakeri has F. hispida as its host, where it parasitizes the other fig wasp Ceratosolen solmsi. The yet unnamed nematode species Caenorhabditis sp. 35 has been found in Aceh, Indonesia, associated with the tree. Caterpillars of the moth species Asota caricae have been recorded eating F. hispida, the caterpillars skeletonise the leaves.

References

hispida
Trees of China
Flora of tropical Asia
Flora of Western Australia
Flora of the Northern Territory
Flora of Queensland
Trees of Australia
Taxa named by Carl Linnaeus
Dioecious plants